This is a list of videos released by the Wiggles. Re-releases that combine two or more videos into one are not counted.

Videos featuring Greg Page: 1993–2006
This is a list of Wiggles videos featuring Greg Page as the Yellow Wiggle. Catalog numbers are primarily based on the original VHS, although many of the videos were later released on DVD (indicated by "-9" in Roadshow catalog number and five-digit Hit Entertainment catalog number) and/or repackaged as bundles.

Videos featuring Sam Moran: 2007–2011
This is a list of Wiggles videos that have Sam Moran as the Yellow Wiggle. The catalog numbers are for the DVD releases in Region 4 (Australia and New Zealand). Some videos were also subsequently released on Blu-ray.

Source: Powerhouse Museum, Catalog Numbers from National Library of Australia.

Videos featuring Greg Page: 2012
This is a list of Wiggles videos which have Greg Page returning to the main cast as the Yellow Wiggle. The catalog numbers are for the DVD releases in Region 4 (Australia and New Zealand). Some videos were also subsequently released on Blu-ray.

Source: Release dates from ABC Shop, Catalog numbers from National Library of Australia.

Videos featuring the new Wiggles: 2013–2021
Videos featuring the new generation of Wiggles.

Source: Release dates from ABC Shop, Catalog numbers from National Library of Australia.

Videos featuring Tsehay Wiggle: 2022–present
Videos featuring Tsehay Wiggle.

Source: Release dates from ABC Shop, Catalog numbers from National Library of Australia.

TV series compilations

Selection of episodes
Wiggly TV (2000 AUS) – 2 episodes from TV Series 2 (Roadshow ABC 102913), 3 on DVD version
Wiggly Play Time (2001 US) – 3 episodes from TV Series 2 VHS only on 14 August 2001 followed by DVD on 2 November 2004. 
Lights, Camera, Action! (2005) – 2 episodes from TV Series 3 & 2 episodes from TV Series 2
The Wiggles Show – The Pick of TV Series 4 (2010) – 9 episodes
Ready, Steady, Wiggle! – The Pick of TV Series 5 (2010) – 9 episodes
Wiggle and Learn – The Pick of TV Series 6 (2011) – 18 episodes
Wake Up Lachy! (2014) – 12 episodes from Ready, Steady, Wiggle! TV series 1
Emma's Bowtiful Day (2014) – 12 episodes from Ready, Steady, Wiggle! TV series 1
Anthony's Fruity Feast (2015) – 12 episodes from Ready, Steady, Wiggle! TV Series 2
Simon Says (2016) – 12 episodes from Ready, Steady, Wiggle! TV Series 2
Fun, Fun, Fun! (2016) – 12 episodes from Ready, Steady, Wiggle! TV Series 2 
 Sing Dance and Play (2019) – 7 episodes from Wiggle Wiggle Wiggle! TV Series
 Eat, Sleep, Wiggle, Repeat! (2020) – 7 episodes from Wiggle Wiggle Wiggle! TV Series
The Wiggles' World (2020) - 13 episodes from The Wiggles' World

Boxsets
TV series box-sets (Australia release only)
The Wiggles – TV Series 1 Collectors Box Set (2005)
The Wiggles – Wiggly TV Series 2 Collection (2007)
Lights, Camera, Action! Wiggles! – Wiggly TV Series 3 (2008)
Fab Four Faves (2016)

Movie
The Wiggles Movie (1997 AUS) (known in US as Magical Adventure: A Wiggly Movie, 4 February 2003) – 20th Century Fox (Catalog #6246SVP)

Documentaries
The Wiggles 15th birthday (2006) – ABC
The Wiggles Take On the World (2006) – 46 minute Accord documentary by Talking Heads Productions and Film Finance Corporation
On the Road with The Wiggles (2008) – ABC
Everybody Clap! Everybody Sing! (2011) – documentary for parents on the Wiggles. Listed on Sprout on Demand, broadcast October–December 2011

Broadcast specials

 The Wiggles Live at Disneyland – broadcast on Disney Channel Australia on 20 December 1998
 The Wiggles Big Show - broadcast on Disney Channel Australia on 17 September 2000
The Wiggles Big Big Show in the Round – theatre broadcast in 2009 
The Wiggles Greatest Hits Show – theatre broadcast in 2011 
The Wiggles Australia Day Concert Special – broadcast on ABC for Kids on 2, on 26 January 2011

References

External links
 
 [ Wiggles discography, Main Albums, at allmusic.com]

Videographies of Australian artists
The Wiggles videos